An anesthetic (American English) or anaesthetic (British English; see spelling differences) is a drug used to induce anesthesia ⁠— ⁠in other words, to result in a temporary loss of sensation or awareness. They may be divided into two broad classes: general anesthetics, which result in a reversible loss of consciousness, and local anesthetics, which cause a reversible loss of sensation for a limited region of the body without necessarily affecting consciousness.

A wide variety of drugs are used in modern anesthetic practice.  Many are rarely used outside anesthesiology, but others are used commonly in various fields of healthcare. Combinations of anesthetics are sometimes used for their synergistic and additive therapeutic effects. Adverse effects, however, may also be increased.  Anesthetics are distinct from analgesics, which block only sensation of painful stimuli.

Local anesthetics 

Local anesthetic agents prevent the transmission of nerve impulses without causing unconsciousness. They act by reversibly binding to fast sodium channels from within nerve fibers, thereby preventing sodium from entering the fibres, stabilising the cell membrane and preventing action potential propagation. Each of the local anesthetics has the suffix "–caine" in their names.

Local anesthetics can be either ester- or amide-based. Ester local anesthetics (such as procaine, amethocaine, cocaine, benzocaine, tetracaine) are generally unstable in solution and fast-acting, are rapidly metabolised by cholinesterases in the blood plasma and liver, and more commonly induce allergic reactions. Amide local anesthetics (such as lidocaine, prilocaine, bupivacaine, levobupivacaine, ropivacaine, mepivacaine, dibucaine and etidocaine) are generally heat-stable, with a long shelf life (around two years). Amides have a slower onset and longer half-life than ester anesthetics, and are usually racemic mixtures, with the exception of levobupivacaine (which is S(-) -bupivacaine) and ropivacaine (S(-)-ropivacaine). Amides are generally used within regional and epidural or spinal techniques, due to their longer duration of action, which provides adequate analgesia for surgery, labor, and symptomatic relief. 

Only preservative-free local anesthetic agents may be injected intrathecally.

Pethidine also has local anesthetic properties, in addition to its opioid effects.

General anesthetics

Inhaled agents 

 Desflurane (common)
 Enflurane (largely discontinued)
 Halothane (inexpensive, discontinued)
 Isoflurane (common)
 Methoxyflurane
 Nitrous oxide
 Sevoflurane (common)
 Xenon (rarely used)
Volatile agents are typically organic liquids that evaporate readily. They are given by inhalation for induction or maintenance of general anesthesia. Nitrous oxide and xenon are gases, so they are not considered volatile agents. The ideal volatile anesthetic should be non-flammable, non-explosive, and lipid-soluble. It should possess low blood gas solubility, have no end-organ (heart, liver, kidney) toxicity or side-effects, should not be metabolized, and should not irritate the respiratory pathways.

No anaesthetic agent currently in use meets all these requirements, nor can any anaesthetic agent be considered completely safe. There are inherent risks and drug interactions that are specific to each and every patient. The agents in widespread current use are isoflurane, desflurane, sevoflurane, and nitrous oxide. Nitrous oxide is a common adjuvant gas, making it one of the most long-lived drugs still in current use. Because of its low potency, it cannot produce anesthesia on its own but is frequently combined with other agents. Halothane, an agent introduced in the 1950s, has been almost completely replaced in modern anesthesia practice by newer agents because of its shortcomings. Partly because of its side effects, enflurane never gained widespread popularity.

In theory, any inhaled anesthetic agent can be used for induction of general anesthesia. However, most of the halogenated anesthetics are irritating to the airway, perhaps leading to coughing, laryngospasm and overall difficult inductions.  All of the volatile agents can be used alone or in combination with other medications to maintain anesthesia (nitrous oxide is not potent enough to be used as a sole agent).

Volatile agents are frequently compared in terms of potency, which is inversely proportional to the minimum alveolar concentration. Potency is directly related to lipid solubility. This is known as the Meyer-Overton hypothesis. However, certain pharmacokinetic properties of volatile agents have become another point of comparison. Most important of those properties is known as the blood/gas partition coefficient. This concept refers to the relative solubility of a given agent in blood. Those agents with a lower blood solubility (i.e., a lower blood–gas partition coefficient; e.g., desflurane) give the anesthesia provider greater rapidity in titrating the depth of anesthesia, and permit a more rapid emergence from the anesthetic state upon discontinuing their administration. In fact, newer volatile agents (e.g., sevoflurane, desflurane) have been popular not due to their potency (minimum alveolar concentration), but due to their versatility for a faster emergence from anesthesia, thanks to their lower blood–gas partition coefficient.

Intravenous agents (non-opioid)
While there are many drugs that can be used intravenously to produce anesthesia or sedation, the most common are:
 Barbiturates
 Amobarbital (trade name: Amytal)
 Methohexital (trade name: Brevital)
 Thiamylal (trade name: Surital)
 Thiopental (trade name: Penthothal, referred to as thiopentone in the UK)
 Benzodiazepines
 Diazepam
 Lorazepam
 Midazolam
 Etomidate
 Ketamine
 Propofol

The two barbiturates mentioned above, thiopental and methohexital, are ultra-short-acting, and are used to induce and maintain anesthesia. However, though they produce unconsciousness, they provide no analgesia (pain relief) and must be used with other agents. Benzodiazepines can be used for sedation before or after surgery and can be used to induce and maintain general anesthesia. When benzodiazepines are used to induce general anesthesia, midazolam is preferred. Benzodiazepines are also used for sedation during procedures that do not require general anesthesia. Like barbiturates, benzodiazepines have no pain-relieving properties. Propofol is one of the most commonly used intravenous drugs employed to induce and maintain general anesthesia. It can also be used for sedation during procedures or in the ICU. Like the other agents mentioned above, it renders patients unconscious without producing pain relief. Because of its favorable physiological effects, "etomidate has been primarily used in sick patients". Ketamine is infrequently used in anesthesia because of the unpleasant experiences that sometimes occur on emergence from anesthesia, which include "vivid dreaming, extracorporeal experiences, and illusions." However, like etomidate it is frequently used in emergency settings and with sick patients because it produces fewer adverse physiological effects. Unlike the intravenous anesthetic drugs previously mentioned, ketamine produces profound pain relief, even in doses lower than those that induce general anesthesia. Also unlike the other anesthetic agents in this section, patients who receive ketamine alone appear to be in a cataleptic state, unlike other states of anesthesia that resemble normal sleep. Ketamine-anesthetized patients have profound analgesia but keep their eyes open and maintain many reflexes.

Intravenous opioid analgesic agents 
While opioids can produce unconsciousness, they do so unreliably and with significant side effects. So, while they are rarely used to induce anesthesia, they are frequently used along with other agents such as intravenous non-opioid anesthetics or inhalational anesthetics. Furthermore, they are used to relieve pain of patients before, during, or after surgery. The following opioids have short onset and duration of action and are frequently used during general anesthesia:
 Alfentanil
 Fentanyl
 Remifentanil
 Sufentanil, which is not available in Australia.

The following agents have longer onset and duration of action and are frequently used for post-operative pain relief:
 Buprenorphine
 Butorphanol
 Diamorphine, also known as heroin, not available for use as an analgesic in any country but the UK.
 Hydromorphone
 Levorphanol
 Pethidine, also called meperidine in North America.
 Methadone
 Morphine
 Nalbuphine
 Oxycodone, not available intravenously in U.S.
 Oxymorphone
 Pentazocine

Muscle relaxants 

Muscle relaxants do not render patients unconscious or relieve pain. Instead, they are sometimes used after a patient is rendered unconscious (induction of anesthesia) to facilitate intubation or surgery by paralyzing skeletal muscle.
 Depolarizing muscle relaxants
 Succinylcholine (also known as suxamethonium in the UK, New Zealand, Australia and other countries, "Celokurin" or "celo" for short in Europe)
 Decamethonium
 Non-depolarizing muscle relaxants
 Short acting
 Mivacurium
 Rapacuronium
 Intermediate acting
 Atracurium
 Cisatracurium
 Rocuronium
 Vecuronium
 Long acting
 Alcuronium
 Doxacurium
 Gallamine
 Metocurine
 Pancuronium
 Pipecuronium
 Tubocurarine

Adverse effects 
 Depolarizing muscle relaxants e.g. Suxamethonium
 Hyperkalemia – A small rise of 0.5 mmol/L occurs normally; this is of little consequence unless potassium is already raised such as in kidney failure
 Hyperkalemia – Exaggerated potassium release in burn patients (occurs from 24 hours after injury, lasting for up to two years), neuromuscular disease and paralyzed (quadriplegic, paraplegic) patients. The mechanism is reported to be through upregulation of acetylcholine receptors in those patient populations with increased efflux of potassium from inside muscle cells. It may cause life-threatening arrhythmia.
 Muscle aches, commoner in young muscular patients who mobilize soon after surgery
 Bradycardia, especially if repeat doses are given
 Malignant hyperthermia, a potentially life-threatening condition in susceptible patients
 Suxamethonium apnea, a rare genetic condition leading to prolonged duration of neuromuscular blockade, which can range from 20 minutes to a number of hours. Not dangerous as long as it is recognized and the patient remains intubated and sedated, there is the potential for awareness if this does not occur.
 Anaphylaxis
 Non-depolarizing muscle relaxants
 Histamine release e.g. Atracurium and Mivacurium
 Anaphylaxis

Another potentially disturbing complication where neuromuscular blockade is employed is 'anesthesia awareness'. In this situation, patients paralyzed may awaken during their anesthesia, due to an inappropriate decrease in the level of drugs providing sedation or pain relief. If this is missed by the anesthesia provider, the patient may be aware of their surroundings, but be incapable of moving or communicating that fact. Neurological monitors are increasingly available that may help decrease the incidence of awareness. Most of these monitors use proprietary algorithms monitoring brain activity via evoked potentials. Despite the widespread marketing of these devices, many case reports exist in which awareness under anesthesia has occurred despite apparently adequate anesthesia as measured by the neurologic monitor.

Intravenous reversal agents
 Flumazenil, reverses the effects of benzodiazepines
 Naloxone, reverses the effects of opioids
 Neostigmine, helps to reverse the effects of non-depolarizing muscle relaxants
 Sugammadex, helps to reverse the effects of non-depolarizing muscle relaxants

References

External links
 Anaesthetics, BBC Radio 4 discussion with David Wilkinson, Stephanie Snow & Anne Hardy (In Our Time, Mar. 29, 2007)